Spiritual Garden is an album by Kitarō, inspired by the Harupin-Ha Butoh Dance of Koichi Tamano.  It also features Kitaro's first collaboration with wife, Keiko Takahashi.

Track listing

Charts

Personnel
Kitaro - Keyboards, Producer, Engineer, Mixing
Keiko Takahashi - Keyboards
Paul Pesco - Guitars
Gary Barlough - Engineer
Alan Mason - Mix
Doug Sax - Mastering
Robert Hadley - Mastering
Additional Personnel
Eiichi Naito - Executive Producer, Management
Dino Malito - A&R, Management
Howard Sapper - Business & Legal Affairs
Hitoshi Saito - Marketing
Kio Griffith - Art Direction, Design

References 

2006 albums
Kitarō albums